Bebearia languida is a butterfly in the family Nymphalidae. It is found in Cameroon and the Democratic Republic of the Congo.

References

Butterflies described in 1920
languida